Binji is a Local Government Area in Sokoto State, Nigeria. Its headquarters are in the town of Binji.

It has an area of 559 km and a population of 105,027 at the 2006 census.

The postal code of the area is 853.

References

Local Government Areas in Sokoto State